Global is the twenty-fifth studio album by American rock musician Todd Rundgren. It was released in April 2015 under Esoteric Antenna.

Track listing

Personnel
 Todd Rundgren - all vocals and instruments, producer, cover art design

References

Todd Rundgren albums
2015 albums
Albums produced by Todd Rundgren